This article is a list of diseases of avocados (Persea americana).

Bacterial diseases

Fungal diseases

Viruslike diseases

Miscellaneous diseases and disorders

References 

 Common Names of Diseases, The American Phytopathological Society

Avocado
 List